John Miles Walker (December 11, 1896 – August 19, 1976) was a Major League Baseball first baseman and catcher. He batted and threw right-handed.

External links
Baseball-Reference

Philadelphia Athletics players
1896 births
1976 deaths
Baseball players from Illinois
People from Toulon, Illinois